João Lins Vieira Cansação de Sinimbu, Viscount of Sinimbu (20 November 1810, in São Miguel dos Campos – 27 December 1906, in Rio de Janeiro) was a Brazilian politician. He was President of the Council of Ministers from 5 January 1878 until 28 March 1880. He served as the President of the Senate from 1887 to 1888.

References 

1810 births
1906 deaths
19th-century Brazilian people
Ambassadors of Brazil to Uruguay
Brazilian nobility
Prime Ministers of Brazil
Finance Ministers of Brazil
Presidents of the Senate of the Empire of Brazil